, was a submarine commander in the Imperial Japanese Navy during World War II. His name is sometimes transliterated as "Takaichi Kinatsu"

Biography
Kinashi was a native of Usuki in Ōita Prefecture. His early career was not promising, as he graduated in very last place as 255th of 255 cadets in the 51st class of the Imperial Japanese Navy Academy in 1920. He served his midshipman duty on the armored cruiser  and light cruiser Tatsuta, and on the armored cruiser  on her long-distance navigational training voyage to Hilo, Hawaii; Acapulco, Mexico; Balboa, Panama; San Francisco, California; Vancouver, British Columbia, Canada; Honolulu, Hawaii; Jaluit Atoll, Truk Atoll, Saipan, and the Ogasawara Islands in 1924–1925. He was promoted to ensign during Izumo′s voyage, and on his return to Japan, he completed naval artillery and torpedo warfare training. He was assigned to the destroyer  and promoted to sub-lieutenant in December 1926.

In 1927, Kinashi transferred to the Japanese submarine force. He was promoted to lieutenant commander in December 1937, and assigned to the minelayer .

Kinashi held his first command, of the submarine , from 1938 to 1940.

At the time of the attack on Pearl Harbor in December 1941, Kinashi was captain of the submarine I-62, which was renumbered  on 20 May 1942. Shortly after commanding I-162 during the Battle of Midway in June 1942, he took command of the submarine .

On 15 September 15, 1942, while patrolling south of the Solomon Islands during the Guadalcanal campaign, I-19 sighted and attacked the American aircraft carrier , which was part of a task force transporting the 7th Marine Regiment and stores to Guadalcanal. Kinashi penetrated the destroyer screen, and after closing to within  of the aircraft carrier, launched his full salvo of six torpedoes. Three torpedoes struck Wasp, starting uncontrollable fires which soon forced the abandonment of the ship, which subsequently sank. The remaining three torpedoes continued beyond the horizon for another  into a separate task force centered around the aircraft carrier , striking the battleship  and destroyer  O'Brien sank several weeks later and North Carolina was so severely damaged that she was out of action for several months for repairs. Kinashi was promoted to commander less than two months later, and honored with a personal interview with Emperor Hirohito.

On 2 May 1943, while near Suva, Fiji, I-19 under the command of Kinashi torpedoed the Liberty ship .  However, for unknown reasons, Kinashi chose not to finish off the heavily damaged ship, which was later towed to New Zealand and repaired, becoming the U.S. Navy cargo ship .

From October 1943, Kinashi was captain of the submarine . On 17 December 1943, I-29 was dispatched on a secret Yanagi mission under the Axis Powers' Tripartite Pact to provide for an exchange of personnel, strategic materials, and manufactured goods between Nazi Germany and the Empire of Japan. At Singapore, she was loaded with 80 tons of raw rubber, 80 tons of tungsten, 50 tons of tin, two tons of zinc, and three tons of quinine, opium, and coffee. In spite of Allied Ultra signals intelligence decryptions revealing her mission, I-29 managed to reach Lorient in German-occupied France on 11 March 1944.  While his crew rested in France, Kinashi travelled to Berlin, where he was awarded the Iron Cross 2nd class personally by Adolf Hitler for his role in sinking Wasp.

I-29 left Lorient on 16 April 1944 with 18 passengers and a cargo torpedo boat engines, Enigma coding machines, radar components, a Walter HWK 509A rocket engine, and Messerschmitt Me 163 and Messerschmitt Me 262 blueprints to support the development of the Mitsubishi J8M rocket plane, arriving at Singapore on 14 July 1944.

During the evening of 26 July 1944, Sawfish hit I-29 with three torpedoes.

Kinashi was promoted posthumously two levels in rank to rear admiral.

References

Books

External links

Notes

1902 births
1944 deaths
Military personnel from Ōita Prefecture
Imperial Japanese Navy admirals
Japanese military personnel killed in World War II
People lost at sea
Recipients of the Iron Cross (1939), 2nd class
Submarine commanders